George Stephen White (23 December 1892 – 29 September 1953) was a former Australian rules footballer who played with Carlton in the Victorian Football League (VFL).

Notes

External links 

George White's profile at Blueseum

1892 births
Australian rules footballers from Melbourne
Carlton Football Club players
Coburg Football Club players
1953 deaths
People from Carlton, Victoria